A Badly Broken Code is the debut studio album by Dessa, a member of Minneapolis indie hip hop collective Doomtree. It was released by Doomtree Records in 2010.

The album title comes from a line in the poem "Nostalgia" by American poet Billy Collins.

Reception
Jakob Dorof of Tiny Mix Tapes gave the album 4 stars out of 5, saying, "The result is likely one of the best hip-hop songs you'll hear this year, let alone from the rare type of MC that manages to be white, female, and supremely talented all in one."

The A.V. Club listed it as the 20th best album of 2010. In 2010, City Pages listed it as the "Best Local Album of the Past 12 Months".

The track "The Bullpen" was frequently used as walk out music at rallies by Minnesota Senator Amy Klobuchar during her 2020 Democratic presidential primaries campaign.

Track listing

Charts

References

External links
 
 

2010 debut albums
Dessa albums
Doomtree Records albums
Albums produced by Lazerbeak